Akua Dixon is an American composer, classical cellist, and lawyer
.

Early years
Dixon was born and raised in New York City. Her early musical experience included singing in a Baptist church. She was educated at the High School of Performing Arts and the Manhattan School of Music, both in New York.

Career 
An early high point in Dixon's career was playing a concert with Duke Ellington when she was about 25 years old. She went on to play at the Copacabana nightclub, at the Apollo Theater (performing with James Brown) and the Waldorf (performing with Diana Ross and Tony Bennett).

Groups in which Dixon has played include the Neo-Bass Ensemble and Quartette Indigo (with her violinist sister, Gayle). Her own group, the Akua Dixon String Ensemble, has accompanied Frank Foster, Antonio Hart, Jimmy Heath, Carmen McRae, Pharoah Sanders, Woody Shaw, and Buster Williams, among other jazz artists.

Dixon created string arrangements for the CD "The Miseducation of Lauryn Hill", which won five Grammy Awards, and for "A Rose Is Still A Rose" by Aretha Franklin, which was nominated for a Grammy Award. Recordings on which Dixon played include the soundtrack of the film School Daze and "Fire and Ice".

With the support of a Rockefeller grant, Dixon composed The Opera of Marie Laveau in the late 1980s.

Dixon received the 1998 African American Classical Music Award from Spelman College, and she received two grants from the National Endowment for the Arts for composition and performance.

Personal life 
Dixon married Steve Turre, a jazz trombonist. They have a daughter and a son, both of whom went into music for their careers.

References

External links 
 Akua Dixon website

Year of birth missing (living people)
Musicians from New York City
Living people
Manhattan School of Music alumni